Mohammad Nor Hakim bin Hassan (born 2 October 1991 in Terengganu) is a Malaysian professional footballer who play as an winger or attacking midfielder for Malaysia Super League club Selangor and the Malaysia national team. His pace and dribbling ability made him an established winger in Malaysia. Nor Hakim previously played for MP Muar, Terengganu, T-Team and PKNS.

Career statistics

Club

International 
As of match played 10 January 2023

Honours

Club
Perak
 Malaysia Super League runner-up: 2018 
 Malaysia Cup: 2018

Selangor 

 Malaysia Cup runner-up: 2022

References

External links
 

1991 births
Living people
Malaysian footballers
PKNS F.C. players
Terengganu FC players
Terengganu F.C. II players
Perak F.C. players
Selangor FA players
Malaysia Super League players
People from Terengganu
Association football midfielders
Malaysian people of Malay descent